"Touch and Go" is a song by American rock band the Cars from their 1980 album Panorama. The song was written and sung by bandleader Ric Ocasek.

Composition
The song's verses feature the use of polymeter. The guitar solo was played over music similar to the chorus, but with some sections extended to give Elliot Easton more measures on the chords E minor, F major, and G major, to build his flashy, melodic solo which resolves to a C major seventh chord.

Release
"Touch and Go" was released as the debut single from Panorama. It reached number 37 on the US Billboard Hot 100 chart in 1980, making it the highest charting American single from Panorama. Its follow-up singles, "Don't Tell Me No" and "Gimme Some Slack" failed to chart.

"Touch and Go" has consistently appeared on many of the Cars' compilation albums, including Greatest Hits, Just What I Needed: The Cars Anthology, Complete Greatest Hits, Shake It Up & Other Hits, and The Essentials. Aside from Just What I Needed: The Cars Anthology, it is the only track from Panorama to appear on said albums.

Reception
"Touch and Go" has generally received positive reception from music critics.  Billboard said that "After the jerky introduction a fluent slight '50-ish melody takes over", that it has "a strangely appealing change in rhythm midway through the song" and also praised the bass playing. Record World called it an "oddly affecting rocker [with] arty vocals delivering an effective hook between sharp rhythm shifts." AllMusic critic Greg Prato said the song was a standout on Panorama "which merges off-time keyboard flourishes with some great textural guitar work by Elliot Easton." Donald Guarisco, also of AllMusic, described the track as "a surprisingly straightforward ballad that became a minor hit for the group", also stating, "the melody is appropriately moody, consisting of attractive verses that hypnotically ebb and flow, a constantly ascending pre-chorus bridge that builds tension and a gorgeous call-and-response chorus that releases that tension", concluding that the song was "a sleek tune perfect for the car radio." Music critic Robert Christgau said that the song was one of the peaks of Panorama.

John Lennon's opinion
Former Beatle John Lennon mentioned the song in his final interview on 8 December 1980, praising it for its 1950s sound and comparing it with his current record at the time, "(Just Like) Starting Over." He said, "I think the Cars' 'Touch and Go' is right out of the fifties 'Oh, oh...' A lot of it is fifties stuff. But with eighties styling, but, but... and that's what I think 'Starting Over' is; it's a fifties song made with an eighties approach."

Charts

References

The Cars songs
1980 singles
Songs written by Ric Ocasek
Song recordings produced by Roy Thomas Baker
Elektra Records singles
1980 songs